Timothy Killeen may refer to:

Timothy L. Killeen, U.S. scientist and professor
Timothy Killeen (politician) (1923–1993), Irish Fianna Fáil politician